The Chief Investigator, Transport Safety (the Chief Investigator) is the independent Government agency responsible for investigation of safety-related trends and incidents in the rail, bus and marine industries in the State of Victoria, Australia.

The position was created as a statutory office by the Transport Integration Act 2010 and commenced on 1 July 2010.  The investigator is one of three independent transport safety agencies in Australia along with the Australian Transport Safety Bureau, a Commonwealth agency, and the Office of the Transport Safety Investigations in New South Wales.

The Chief Investigator, Transport Safety is one of two dedicated transport safety offices in Victoria, the other being the Director, Transport Safety.  The Chief Investigator is responsible for no blame or just culture investigations and inquiries in the transport sector while the Director has responsibility for safety regulation and compliance.

The Chief Investigator contributes to transport safety by independently investigating, analysing and openly reporting on transport safety matters.   All investigations are "no blame": this means the emphasis is on understanding causes and trends and learning to improve future transport safety.

The Chief Investigator is separate from other transport regulatory authorities such as the Director, Transport Safety (Transport Safety Victoria), WorkSafe (the Victorian WorkCover Authority) and State, Territory and Commonwealth regulators and investigators, including the Australian Transport Safety Bureau.  The Chief Investigator is also independent of transport operators such as Metro Trains, V/Line, Yarra Trams and bus and shipping companies.

The Chief Investigator reports to two Ministers: the Minister for Public Transport in respect of rail and bus matters and the Minister for Ports in respect of shipping and boating matters.  However, independence is underscored by the fact that the Ministers have few powers over the Chief Investigator, the prime power being the capacity to require the Chief Investigator to conduct an investigation into a transport safety matter.

Main responsibilities

Trains and trams 
The Chief Investigator is responsible for no blame or just culture safety oversight of the rail sector in Victoria under the Transport (Compliance and Miscellaneous) Act 1983.    This involves investigations relating to -

 trains in Melbourne (currently operated under contract with Public Transport Victoria by Metro Trains Melbourne) - these services cover the provision of suburban rail services in Melbourne
 trams in Melbourne (currently operated under contract with Public Transport Victoria by Keolis Downer) - these services cover the provision of suburban tram and light rail services in Melbourne
 trains in regional Victoria (regional passenger rail services are generally operated under contract with Public Transport Victoria by V/Line Corporation; freight services are operated by a variety of operators including Pacific National; the Australian Rail Track Corporation is the infrastructure manager for the Defined Interstate Rail Network - these services cover the provision of train services in country and regional Victoria
 tourist and heritage rail operations in Victoria
 relevant public agencies such as Public Transport Victoria and VicTrack which have responsibility for providing rail services or land and asset services related to rail operations.

Buses 
The Chief Investigator is also responsible for no blame or just culture safety investigations of bus services in Melbourne and wider Victoria (large public buses are generally operated in Victoria under contract between Public Transport Victoria and a wide variety of bus operators) including mini bus operators.  Power is derived from the Transport (Compliance and Miscellaneous) Act 1983.

Commercial shipping and recreational boating 
The Chief Investigator, Transport Safety is also the no blame or just culture safety investigator of the commercial shipping and recreational boating sectors in Victoria.  The responsibilities of the Chief Investigator focus on the monitoring of trading, fishing and Government vessels as well as hire and drive vessels.  The monitoring of recreational craft covers the investigation of a wide range of vessels including yachts, speedboats, jet skis, canoes and paddle boats.  The Chief Investigator's jurisdiction to investigate shipping and boating arises under the Transport (Compliance and Miscellaneous) Act 1983.

Governance

Establishment 
The office of the Chief Investigator, Transport Safety was established following the passage and commencement of the Transport Integration Act 2010.   The office arose from the abolition of the former office of the Chief Investigator, Public Transport and Marine Safety Investigations.

Transport Integration Act 
The Transport Integration Act provides the Chief Investigator, Transport Safety with a governance framework - the objects, functions and powers  - which comprise the charter of the office.

Objects 
The Transport Integration Act provides that the primary object of the Chief Investigator, Transport Safety is to "...seek to improve transport safety by providing for the independent no-blame investigation of transport safety matters...".

Functions 
The primary functions of the Chief Investigator, Transport Safety are to -

 investigate transport safety matters
 report the results of any investigations to the Minister.

The Transport Integration Act provides that in investigating an incident, the Chief Investigator, Transport Safety is to primarily focus on -

 determining what factors caused the incident, rather than to apportion blame
 identifying issues that may require review, monitoring or further consideration.

Additional functions of the Chief Investigator include -

 performing functions or duties conferred on the office by the Marine Safety Act 2010 and the Transport (Compliance and Miscellaneous) Act 1983 and other relevant Acts and regulations made under those Acts
 liaising with international, Commonwealth and State bodies that have similar functions to those of the Chief Investigator, Transport Safety
 administering voluntary reporting system established under the Transport (Compliance and Miscellaneous) Act 1983
 improving the quality and professionalism of investigations through education of those involved in the operation or use of rail, bus and marine transport.

Powers 
The Transport Integration Act provides that the Chief Investigator has the power to investigate any transport safety matter. More specific powers are contained in the Transport (Compliance and Miscellaneous) Act 1983 and the Marine Safety Act 2010.  Supporting compliance powers are established in the Transport (Compliance and Miscellaneous) Act 1983 for the rail and bus industries.

The compliance support scheme centres on provisions enabling the appointment of authorised officers and conferral of coercive powers. The key elements are - 
 appointment of officers transport safety officers
 powers relating to entry to premises, inspection, securing sites, use of force and seizure of things
 powers to search, enter and require production of documents and information and to require name and address details
 power to require persons to attend and answer questions

The powers of the Chief Investigator in the marine sector under the Marine Safety Act 2010 cover many of the areas listed above.  Special provisions relating to disclosure and admissibility of evidence apply to the Chief Investigator.

Reports 
The Chief Investigator is required to give a copy of reports on transport safety investigations as soon as practicable after completing investigations. Before issuing reports to the Minister, the Chief Investigator must consult with the Director, Transport Safety, the Director of Public Transport, the Secretary of the Department of Transport, any person who assisted the Chief Investigator with the investigation and any other relevant person or body.

Independence 
The Chief Investigator, Transport Safety is independent of Ministers and Government generally.  The Transport Integration Act provides, for example, that the Chief Investigator "...when performing or exercising his or her functions, is independent and is not subject to the direction and control of the Minister." Independence is supported by provisions requiring that the removal of the Director from office and can only occur with the approval of both Houses of Parliament.

Relationship to ATSB 
The Australian Transport Safety Bureau (ATSB) investigates safety matters in the aviation industry as well as certain matters in the rail and marine industries.  For example, ATSB investigates incidents on the Defined Interstate Rail Network (DIRN) due to its national significance.  ATSB also conducts investigations into accidents and serious incidents involving Australian registered ships anywhere in the world, foreign flag ships within Australian waters and certain other ships.  ATSB's powers are derived from the Transport Safety Investigation Act 2003 of the Commonwealth.

Powers over all bus incidents and all other rail and marine matters vests in the Chief Investigator, Transport Safety.  The Chief Investigator is, however, given power by the Transport (Compliance and Miscellaneous) Act 1983 of Victoria to ask ATSB to investigate any transport accident or incident that has occurred in Victoria.

Other Victorian transport agencies 

There are a range of State agencies responsible for the transport system in Victoria.  The Department of Transport (DOT) oversees and coordinates the activities of the agencies which can be divided into three main types - statutory offices, statutory authorities and independent transport safety agencies.  Together with DOT, the agencies provide, manage and regulate transport system activities in Victoria including -
 heavy and light rail systems including trains and trams
 roads systems and vehicles including cars, trucks and bicycles
 ports and waterways including commercial ships and recreational vessels
 some air transport systems

Statutory offices 
The statutory office is the Transport Infrastructure Development Agent.  The agency has a distinct statutory charter and powers.

Statutory authorities 
The statutory authorities are -
 the Roads Corporation (VicRoads)
 the Public Transport Development Authority
 Victorian Rail Track (VicTrack)
 V/Line Corporation (V/Line)
 Taxi Services Commission
 the Linking Melbourne Authority
 the Port of Melbourne Corporation
 the Victorian Regional Channels Authority
 the Transport Ticketing Authority
 the Regional Rail Link Authority.

These agencies are structurally separate from the Department of Transport.

Independent transport safety agencies 
The Chief Investigator, Transport Safety is one of two independent transport safety agencies in the State.  The other agency is the Director, Transport Safety.  These agencies are part of the Department of Transport but are functionally independent and report to the relevant Ministers. The Director, Transport Safety has oversight of safety regulation schemes and industry performance under the schemes.  By contrast, the Chief Investigator, Transport Safety is responsible for no blame or just culture inquiries and investigations in the transport sector.

See also 

 Rail Transport in Victoria
 Railways in Melbourne
 Trams in Melbourne
 Buses in Melbourne
 Rail Safety Act
 Transport Integration Act
 Director, Transport Safety
 Bus Safety Act
 Director, Public Transport Safety
 Safety
 Australian Transport Safety Bureau
 Transport Act 1983
 Transport (Compliance and Miscellaneous) Act 1983

References

External links 
 Transport Safety Victoria
 Department of Transport website
 Government of Victoria website

Public transport in Melbourne
Government agencies of Victoria (Australia)
Transport safety organizations